Dr Pepper is a carbonated soft drink. It was created in the 1880s by pharmacist Charles Alderton in Waco, Texas, and first served around 1885. Dr Pepper was first nationally marketed in the United States in 1904. It is now also sold in Europe, Asia, North and South America. In Australia, New Zealand and South Africa, Dr Pepper is sold as an imported good. Variants include Diet Dr Pepper and, beginning in the 2000s, a line of additional flavors.

History

The name "Dr. Pepper" was first used commercially in 1885. It was introduced nationally in the United States at the 1904 Louisiana Purchase Exposition as a new kind of soda pop, made with 23 flavors. Its introduction in 1885 preceded the introduction of Coca-Cola by one year.

It was formulated by Brooklyn-born pharmacist Charles Alderton in Morrison's Old Corner Drug Store in Waco, Texas. To test his new drink, he first offered it to store owner Wade Morrison, who also found it to his liking. Patrons at Morrison's soda fountain soon learned of Alderton's new drink and began ordering a "Waco." Alderton gave the formula to Morrison, who named it Dr. Pepper (later stylized as "Dr Pepper").

Early advertisements for this soft drink made medical claims, stating that it "aids digestion and restores vim, vigor, and vitality."

As with Coca-Cola, the formula for Dr Pepper is a trade secret, and allegedly the recipe is kept as two halves in safe deposit boxes in two separate Dallas banks.  A persistent rumor since the 1930s is that the drink contains prune juice, but the official Dr Pepper FAQ refutes this with "Dr Pepper is a unique blend of natural and artificial flavors; it does not contain prune juice."  The origin of the rumor is unknown; some believe it was started by a deliveryman for a competitor trying to cast aspersions based on prune juice's laxative effects, but it may simply be because many people feel that Dr Pepper tastes similar to prune juice.

In 2009, an old ledger book filled with formulas and recipes was discovered by Bill Waters while shopping at antiques stores in the Texas Panhandle. Several sheets and letterheads hinted it had come from the W.B. Morrison & Co. Old Corner Drug Store (the same store where Dr Pepper was first served in 1885) and faded letters on the book's cover spelled out "Castles Formulas". John Castles was a partner of Morrison's for a time and worked at that location as early as 1880. One recipe in the book titled "Dr Peppers Pepsin Bitters" was of particular interest, and some speculated it could be an early recipe for Dr Pepper. However, Keurig Dr Pepper insists it is not the formula for Dr Pepper, but is instead a medicinal recipe for a digestive aid. The book was put up for auction in May 2009, but no one purchased it.

Name
Theories about the origins of the soft drink's name abound. One possible reason that the name was chosen was the practice, common at the time of the drink's creation, of including Dr. in the names of products to convey the impression that they were healthful.

A theory often cited is that the drink was named after an actual doctor, one Charles T. Pepper of Rural Retreat, Virginia. Morrison may have named the drink after the doctor in gratitude for Pepper having given Morrison his first job. Another story tells of Morrison naming the drink after Charles T. Pepper because the doctor granted Morrison permission to marry Pepper's daughter, but the girl in question was only eight years old at the time that Morrison moved to Waco.

A Dr. William Alexander Reed Pepper of Christiansburg is another possible inspiration for the soft drink's name. In the census that shows Morrison living in Christiansburg and working as a pharmacy clerk, a Dr. Pepper is recorded on a subsequent page. Since census takers at this time were walking from door to door, and these census entries are close to each other in the record, it appears that Morrison and this Dr. Pepper lived close to each other. Furthermore, Pepper is recorded as having a 16-year-old daughter, named Mary Ann "Minnie".

The period (full stop) after Dr was used intermittently in Dr Pepper logos until the 1950s, when, after some debate, it was discarded permanently, for stylistic and legibility reasons. A logo that debuted at that time had slanted text, in which Dr. resembled Di:.

Legal and trade history
In 1951, Dr Pepper sued the Coca-Cola company for US$750,000, asserting that nickel Coca-Colas were sold below cost and were a restraint of trade.

In 1969, owing to Dr Pepper's legal success as being determined a "non-cola" soft drink, then President & CEO W.W. "Foots" Clements was successful in persuading the Coca-Cola Bottling Company of New York, the largest bottler and distributor of Cola-Cola in the world, to bottle and distribute Dr Pepper in the New York metropolitan area.

In 1972, Dr Pepper sued the Coca-Cola company for trademark infringement based on a soft drink marketed by Coca-Cola called "Peppo." Coca-Cola renamed their beverage Mr. Pibb.

Dr Pepper became insolvent in the early 1980s, prompting an investment group to take the company private. Several years later, Coca-Cola attempted to acquire Dr Pepper, but was blocked from doing so by the Federal Trade Commission (FTC). Around the same time, Seven Up was acquired from Phillip Morris by the same investment company that bailed out Dr Pepper. Upon the failure of the Coca-Cola merger, Dr Pepper and Seven Up merged (creating Dr Pepper/Seven Up, Inc., or DPSU), giving up international branding rights in the process. After the DPSU merger, Coca-Cola obtained most non-US rights to the Dr Pepper name (with PepsiCo taking the Seven Up rights).

Dr Pepper was a frequent player in the 1990s antitrust history of the United States. As part of these activities, economists and the courts have weighed in with the opinion that Dr Pepper is a "pepper" flavored drink and not a "cola". In 1995, the FTC blocked a merger between The Coca-Cola Company and Dr Pepper on grounds that included concerns about a monopoly of the "pepper" flavor category of soft drinks. In 1996, Dr Pepper was involved in an antitrust case involving Jerry Jones, the Dallas Cowboys, NFL Properties, Nike, and other commercial interests active at Texas Stadium in Irving, Texas. Jones had made deals with Dr Pepper and the other companies that, the league said, violated their exclusive marketing contracts with Coca-Cola and other businesses. The NFL agreed to allow Jones and other teams to pursue their own agreements.

Varieties

North America

International

Distribution
In the United States, Keurig Dr Pepper does not have a complete network of bottlers and distributors, so the drink is sometimes bottled under contract by Coca-Cola or Pepsi bottlers. Prior to the initial Cadbury Schweppes investment-turned-buyout, 30% of Dr Pepper/Seven Up products were produced and distributed by Pepsi bottlers, and another 30% by Coca-Cola bottlers. The remaining 40% were produced and distributed by independent bottlers (mainly consisting of Dr Pepper/Seven Up premerger regional bottlers) and the Dr Pepper/Seven Up Bottling Group. Currently, the majority of Pepsi and Coke bottlers bottling Dr Pepper are owned by PepsiCo and The Coca-Cola Company after their buyouts of their major bottlers.

Presently, Keurig Dr Pepper relies on its own bottling group to bottle and distribute its products in more than 30 states. Coca-Cola and Pepsi have essentially stopped bottling and distributing Cadbury-Schweppes products in favor of in-house alternatives, although regional exceptions can be found.

In Canada and Poland, Cadbury-Schweppes has licensed distribution rights to PepsiCo. In Mexico, Germany, Sweden, the Netherlands, Slovakia, Austria, the Czech Republic, Belgium and Norway, Cadbury-Schweppes owns the trademark and distributes the product. In Finland, the product is bottled by Sinebrychoff which also bottles Coca-Cola Company's products. In Romania, it can be found only in larger cities, imported from Belgium. In Portugal, Spain, France, Turkey, and Greece, it is very difficult to find, as it is usually imported from the United Kingdom. In almost all of the other countries of the world, the Coca-Cola Company purchased the trademark from Cadbury-Schweppes and distributes the product. This mixed worldwide ownership of the trademark is due to antitrust regulations which prevented Coca-Cola from purchasing the rights everywhere.

Dr Pepper is also available in Russia (though imported, generally from Poland — there's no local bottling despite numerous talks), South Korea and Ukraine. Although no longer locally bottled in Australia or New Zealand, Dr Pepper is imported and sold by United States Foods, and many other small retailers in Australia, with the UK (sugar) version sold in the British sections of Coles and Woolworths supermarkets. Dr Pepper is not available in Thailand, North Korea and Serbia. It is also sold in Indonesia, where it is imported by PT Citra Gourmand Prima (formerly PT Armasco Prima) with its office in Sunter, North Jakarta, but it is rarely sold in the Philippines, Malaysia and Singapore, as it is imported from the United States.
In Lebanon Dr Pepper is always available in supermarkets and convenience stores through imports mainly from the United States, the United Kingdom and Belgium.

Dr Pepper has been sold in Japan since 1973 and is widely available in greater Tokyo, Okinawa and parts of the Tōkai region, where it is distributed by local Coca-Cola bottlers. It is not actively marketed in other regions of Japan; Coca-Cola's Osaka bottler began selling Dr Pepper in 1983, but pulled the product two years later due to low sales.

Other products
 Dr Pepper has a line of jelly beans made by the Jelly Belly company.
 Hubba Bubba bubblegum produces a Dr Pepper-flavored edition. The gum is the same color as the soda.
 Dr Pepper collaborated with Vita Food Products to produce Dr Pepper Sweet & Kickin' BBQ Sauce and Dr Pepper "More than Mesquite" Marinade.
 Cosmetics company Bonne Bell includes Dr Pepper among its licensed soft drink-flavored "Lip Smackers" lip balms.
 Brach's has a line of hard candy that features Dr Pepper, Orange Crush, A&W Root Beer and 7 Up flavored hard candies in Brach's Soda Poppers.
 Dr Pepper has an ice cream topping syrup also manufactured by Vita Food Products in 2009 called "Dr Pepper cherry dessert topping".
 Dr Pepper also created an iPod skin cover, but it was discontinued.
 Dr Pepper Slurpee is sold by retailer 7-Eleven.
 Dr Pepper Flavored Freezies are currently available with Grape Crush and Hires Root Beer flavors.
 The Serious Bean Company makes a variety of baked beans using Dr Pepper in the sauce.

Marketing

"Dr Pepper Time", according to one promotion, was at 10, 2 and 4 o'clock. During World War II, a syndicated radio program, The 10–2–4 Ranch (later titled 10–2–4 Time), aired in the South and other areas where Dr Pepper was distributed. The show featured the Sons of the Pioneers and Dick Foran. In the 1960s, the tune of the chorus of "The Glow-Worm" was used in ads, with lyrics which ended, "It's Dr Pepper Time!"

In the early 1960s, Dr Pepper promoted the idea of serving the drink hot with lemon slices in winter. This idea appeared in the film Blast from the Past initially set in the early 1960s.

Around 1967, Dr Pepper released the "Charge" ad:

In 1977, Jake Holmes wrote the lyrics to "Be a Pepper". Earlier in the 1970s, Holmes and Randy Newman wrote another jingle entitled "The Most Original Soft Drink Ever". Barry Manilow performed Holmes's jingle in concerts and on albums under the inclusion of "VSM – Very Strange Medley". A TV commercial was also created using the jingle and ran from 1977 to 1985. The song noted "It's not a cola, it's something much much more. It's not a root beer, you get root beer by the score." The "Be a Pepper" series referred to fans of Dr Pepper as "Peppers" and often featured large, sequential, crowd dance scenes, intricately choreographed by Tony Stevens and led onscreen by actor David Naughton. The chorus of the jingle as written by Holmes was:

This became grist for a number of pop culture references and parodies. One of the first was a July 1981 sketch on the program SCTV, in which an overly-excited injured man (Eugene Levy) extols the work of a "Dr Shekter" (Rick Moranis) who has been treating him. Levy and a group of patients wearing casts and crutches engage in their own elaborate dancing and singing ("Wouldn't you like to see my doctor, too?"), which Shekter first uses as an opportunity to explain his work, and then grows alarmed ("These people should not be dancing!"). In the 1982 sex farce The Beach Girls, the slogan became "I'm a popper, he's a popper..." Wreck-Gar parodied the slogan in The Return of Optimus Prime.

After appearing in a series of commercials, David Naughton had his breakthrough film role as the main character in the John Landis film An American Werewolf in London. Another famous "I'm a Pepper" dancer was Ray Bolger, the actor who played the Scarecrow in the film The Wizard of Oz.

W.W. Clements, former CEO and president of the Dr Pepper/7-Up Company, similarly described the taste of Dr Pepper as one-of-a-kind, saying, "I've always maintained you cannot tell anyone what Dr Pepper tastes like because it's so different. It's not an apple, it's not an orange, it's not a strawberry, it's not a root beer, it's not even a cola. It's a different kind of drink with a unique taste all its own."

The 1980s "Out of the Ordinary" advertising campaign involved a series of postapocalyptic commercials featuring a space cowboy and an alien sidekick seeking "something different" from a simple generic cola. The campaign also produced commercials featuring the movie creature Godzilla, where citizens of a Japanese town offered Dr Pepper as a libation. The commercials were prominently featured during the 1986 syndication of The Canned Film Festival, which was sponsored by the Dr Pepper Company.

On December 20, 2000, episode of the Late Show with David Letterman, Letterman jokingly referred to Dr Pepper as "liquid manure". After a representative of Dr Pepper complained, CBS agreed not to rerun that episode. Letterman repeatedly made assurances on the show that he was joking.

As of 2009, the slogan of the product was "Drink it slow. Doctor's orders". Advertising supporting the slogan has celebrities with famous relations to the word "doctor" (Dr. Dre, Julius "Dr. J" Erving, Gene Simmons (writer of the Kiss song "Calling Dr. Love"), et al.) or who played fictional doctors (such as Neil Patrick Harris or Kelsey Grammer) endorsing the beverage. The ads culminate with the celebrity stating, "Trust me. I'm a doctor", followed by the new slogan appearing onscreen with a glass of Dr Pepper.

The introduction of Dr Pepper Ten in 2011 featured a marketing campaign targeting men, citing market research suggesting that most diet soft drinks had been perceived as appealing primarily to women. The campaign featured overtly masculine imagery, including an action movie-themed television commercial denouncing other diet beverages as "lady drinks", a Facebook page featuring "Man'Ments", and the slogan "It's Not for Women". Some critics considered the campaign to be sexist.

Slogans

 1889–1914: "King of Beverages."
 1920s–1940s: "Drink a Bite to Eat at 10, 2, and 4 o'clock."
 1939: "When You Drink a Dr. Pepper You Drink a Bite to Eat."
 1930s–1940s: "Good For Life."
 1945: "Dr. Pepper has 23 flavors"
 1950s: "The Friendly Pepper Upper."
 1960s: "America's Most Misunderstood Soft Drink."
 1970s-77: "The Most Original Soft Drink Ever."
 1977–1983: "I'm a Pepper, He's a Pepper, We're a Pepper.", "Be a Pepper.", "Wouldn't you like to Be a Pepper too?"
 1983: "Dr Pepper Has Made a Pepper Out of me."
 1983: "It Tastes and It Looks." (Sugar Free Dr Pepper)
 c. 1984 "Out of the Ordinary. Like You."
 c. 1984 "The Taste for Out of the Ordinary Bodies." (Diet Dr Pepper)
 1984–1997: "Hold Out For the Out of the Ordinary."
 ?1980s–Present "Dr Pepper, what's the worst that could happen?", used in the UK, playing on the fact that many UK consumers don't know what the drink tastes like and are wary of trying it
 1991: "Just what the Doctor ordered."
 c. 1997: "It's Dr Pepper Flavour, Silly!" Australia
 c. 1997: "Expect the Unexpected!" Australia
 1997: "Now's the Time. This is the Place. Dr Pepper Is The Taste."
 2000: "Dr Pepper, It Makes the World Taste Better."
 2000–Present: "Just What The Dr Ordered."
 c. 2001 "Dr Pepper, so misunderstood"
 2002–2004: "Be You."
 2002–Present: "Solves All Your Problems." (used in Europe)
 2003 "Dr Pepper, to try it is to love it" (used in the UK)
 2005–Present: "One Taste & You Get It."
 2006: "Can You Handle The Taste?" (seen in Austria, Denmark, Finland, Germany, Netherlands, Sweden, and Poland)
 2006: "Authentic blend of 23 flavors." United States, Canada
 2006: "Dr Pepper, makes the world go round."
 2006: "Dr Pepper, nothing better." United States
 2006: "The Dr knows the right touch." (used in Europe)
 2006: "There's more to it." United States
 c. 2006: "Get Berried in Cream" United States (used for the new Berries and Cream flavor)
 2007: "I Want It All." United States
 2007: "El Dr muy bueno" Latin America
 2008: "Drink It Slow, Dr's Orders" (United States)
 2009: "Trust me – I'm a Doctor." (ft. Julius Erving, Kelsey Grammer, Gene Simmons, Dr. Dre) United States
 2009: "It's so amazingly smooth, you have try it to believe it!" and "Amazingly smooth" Dr Pepper Cherry
 2010: "There's nothing like a Pepper" United States
 2011: "Can you handle the taste?"
 2012: "Always One of a Kind" (United States)

Dr Pepper Girl

In 1963, singer Donna Loren became a spokesperson for the company when she was selected in a nationwide search to be the “Dr Pepper Girl”. National exposure followed for Loren as she promoted the drink via radio, print, television, calendars, billboards, and personal appearances. One of her first appearances for the company was as co-host with Dick Clark (whom she worked with regularly) of an ABC television special, Dr Pepper Celebrity Party. She subsequently made hundreds of singing and personal appearances for Dr Pepper. In Dr Pepper—King of Beverages, Dr Pepper historian Harry E. Ellis wrote, “Sparkly, vivacious and gifted with a wonderful voice, Donna was an immediate success. She became widely known in a short period as "The Dr Pepper Girl," appearing at special events and on programs sponsored by the company. Miss Loren would figure prominently in Dr Pepper's plans for some five years, not only as an entertainer but doing commercials for radio and TV and appearing in many forms of advertising. She appeared on 24-sheet poster boards, point-of-sale and on Dr Pepper calendars.”

Donna Loren’s role as Dr Pepper spokesperson led to her first appearance in the American International Pictures’ Beach Party film Muscle Beach Party. Loren later explained: “Dr Pepper was involved in that [the Beach Party movies] and actually placed me as product placement. And because I could sing, they gave me a duet with Dick Dale, and then it just went on from there.” From this, she went on to appear in three more Beach Party films. Away from the company, Loren was a familiar presence in the 1960s due to her many performances on television, films, and her records for Capitol, Reprise and other labels. She represented Dr Pepper until 1968.

From 1961 until 1981, Dr Pepper was also the sponsor of the Miss Teenage America beauty pageant.

Free Dr Pepper for everyone in America
On March 26, 2008, various media outlets reported that Dr Pepper would offer "a free can of Dr Pepper to everyone in America" – excluding former Guns N' Roses guitarists Buckethead and Slash – if the band released the long-awaited Chinese Democracy in 2008. Later in the day, lead vocalist Axl Rose replied to Dr Pepper on Guns N' Roses' official website and spoke of his surprise at Dr Pepper's support. Rose also said he would share his Dr Pepper with Buckethead as "some of Buckethead's performances are on Chinese Democracy". After it was announced that the album would be released in 2008, Dr Pepper stated that it would uphold its pledge.

Dr Pepper's online distribution of free coupons upon the album's release November 23, 2008, proved inadequate. Lawyers for the band threatened Dr Pepper's parent company with a lawsuit two days after the album's release. In a letter to Dr Pepper, Rose's lawyer Alan Gutman said, "The redemption scheme your company clumsily implemented for this offer was an unmitigated disaster which defrauded consumers and, in the eyes of vocal fans, ruined Chinese Democracy'''s release." Rose's lawyer also demanded that the company make a full-page apology that would appear in The Wall Street Journal, USA Today, The New York Times and The Los Angeles Times. In a later interview, Rose claimed he told his lawyers it was a non-issue and was surprised by their actions.

Museum

The Dr Pepper Museum, located in the Artesian Manufacturing and Bottling Company building at 300 South Fifth Street in downtown Waco, Texas, opened to the public in 1991. The building was the first building to be built specifically to bottle Dr Pepper. It was completed in 1906, and Dr Pepper was bottled there until the 1960s. The museum has three floors of exhibits, a working old-fashioned soda fountain, and a gift store of Dr Pepper memorabilia.

Dr Pepper Capital of the World
The company sells more Dr Pepper in the Roanoke Valley area of Virginia than any other metropolitan area east of the Mississippi River. John William "Bill" Davis opened the first Dr. Pepper plant east of the Mississippi in Roanoke in 1936; subsequently the city was named the "Dr Pepper Capital of the World" and broke world records for its mass consumption of Dr Pepper in the late 1950s. Dr Pepper donated a portion of its sales revenue in the Roanoke area to finance restoration of a circa-1950s neon Dr Pepper sign, which has the company's "10–2–4" logo from the time, in downtown Roanoke. In October 2015, the city of Roanoke declared October 24 (10–24) to be its official Dr. Pepper Day.

References

Further reading
 

External links

 Dr Pepper official website
 Dr Pepper on MySpace
 The Dr Pepper Museum
 Dr Pepper Company at Handbook of Texas Online''
 FTC Statement on Coca-Cola Dr Pepper Merger
 Temple Bottling Company, in Temple, Texas 
 Bootlegging Dr Pepper, June 5, 2008, by Robb Walsh, Houston Press
 Original Formula Found at Drug Store
 
 Caffeine Content for Dr Pepper flavors compared to some other beverages, Good Housekeeping

Keurig Dr Pepper brands
Carbonated drinks
Dr Pepper-flavored sodas
Food and drink companies established in 1885
History of Waco, Texas
Products introduced in 1885
Patent medicines
Caffeinated soft drinks